This article lists described species of the family Asilidae start with letter G.

A
B
C
D
E
F
G
H
I
J
K
L
M
N
O
P
Q
R
S
T
U
V
W
Y
Z

List of Species

Genus Galactopogon
 Galactopogon fumipennis (Janssens, 1961)
 Galactopogon hispidus (Engel, 1929)

Genus Gerrolasius
 Gerrolasius hermanni (Londt, 1988)
 Gerrolasius meridionalis (Hermann, 1920)
 Gerrolasius oldroydi (Londt, 1988)

Genus Gibbasilus
 Gibbasilus arenaceus (Londt, 1986)
 Gibbasilus brevicolis (Londt, 1990)
 Gibbasilus centrolobus (Londt, 1990)

Genus Glaphyropyga
 Glaphyropyga aristata (Carrera, 1950)
 Glaphyropyga attenuata (Hull, 1958)
 Glaphyropyga bolivari (Ayala, 1983)
 Glaphyropyga carrerai (Ayala, 1983)
 Glaphyropyga dryas (Fisher, 1982)
 Glaphyropyga himantocera (Wiedemann, 1828)
 Glaphyropyga pollinifera (Carrera, 1945)
 Glaphyropyga renatoi (Ayala, 1983)
 Glaphyropyga setosifemur (Enderlein, 1914)
 Glaphyropyga tachirensis (Ayala, 1983)
 Glaphyropyga tiarensis (Ayala, 1983)
 Glaphyropyga venezuelensis (Carrera & Machado-Allison, 1963)

Genus Glyphotriclis
 Glyphotriclis impulvinatus (Oldroyd, 1958)
 Glyphotriclis ornatus (Schiner, 1868)

Genus Goneccalypsis
 Goneccalypsis argenteoviridis (Hermann, 1907)
 Goneccalypsis gooti (Hradský & Geller-Grimm, 2000)
 Goneccalypsis lucida (Hermann, 1912)
 Goneccalypsis montanus (Londt, 1982)

Genus Gongromyia
 Gongromyia bulla (Londt, 2002)

Genus Gonioscelis
 Gonioscelis amnoni (Londt, 2004)
 Gonioscelis batyleon (Londt, 2004)
 Gonioscelis bykanistes (Londt, 2004)
 Gonioscelis ceresae (Oldroyd, 1974)
 Gonioscelis chloris (Londt, 2004)
 Gonioscelis congoensis (Oldroyd, 1970)
 Gonioscelis cuthbertsoni (Londt, 2004)
 Gonioscelis engeli (Londt, 2004)
 Gonioscelis exouros (Londt, 2004)
 Gonioscelis feijeni (Londt, 2004)
 Gonioscelis francoisi (Oldroyd, 1970)
 Gonioscelis genitalis (Ricardo, 1925)
 Gonioscelis hadrocantha (Londt, 2004)
 Gonioscelis haemorhous (Schiner, 1867)
 Gonioscelis iota (Londt, 2004)
 Gonioscelis kedros (Londt, 2004)
 Gonioscelis maculiventris (Bigot, 1879)
 Gonioscelis melas (Londt, 2004)
 Gonioscelis nigripennis (Ricardo, 1925)
 Gonioscelis occipitalis (Oldroyd, 1970)
 Gonioscelis phacopterus (Schiner, 1867)
 Gonioscelis pickeri (Londt, 2004)
 Gonioscelis pruinosus (Ricardo, 1925)
 Gonioscelis punctipennis (Engel, 1925)
 Gonioscelis scapularis (Macquart, 1838)
 Gonioscelis submaculatus (Speiser, 1910)
 Gonioscelis tomentosus (Oldroyd, 1970)
 Gonioscelis truncatus (Oldroyd, 1974)
 Gonioscelis whittingtoni (Londt, 2004)
 Gonioscelis xanthochaites (Londt, 2004)
 Gonioscelis zulu (Londt, 2004)

Genus Grajahua
 Grajahua lopesi (Artigas & Papavero, 1991)

Genus Graptostylus
 Graptostylus dolosus (Hull, 1962)

Genus Grypoctonus
 Grypoctonus engeli (Hradský & Geller-Grimm, 1999)
 Grypoctonus aino (Speiser, 1928)
 Grypoctonus lama (Speiser, 1928)

Genus Gymnotriclis
 Gymnotriclis coscaronorum (Artigas & Papavero, 1997)

References 

 
Asilidae